John Cossins (1697 (Brompton-by-Sawdon), –1743) was an early cartographer, known for the following city maps:
 plan of Leeds (c.1730) titled "A New and Exact Plan of the Town of Leedes"
 map of York (1726): "New and Exact Plan of the City of York" This displayed fashionable new houses around the margin of the map.

Family
Cossins was the elder of the two sons and three daughters of William Cossins of Brompton, who (1707-1725) was steward of the Hackness estate, then consisting of the townships of Hackness, Suffield, Everley, Silpho, Broxa, Langdale End, much of Harwood Dale and some of Burniston. It was as map-maker of this lordship that John first learned the practice and skills of land surveying and drawing.

Notebooks
In 1993 Sothebys offered Cossins' notebook for sale. It was bought by York City Archives. It contained notes on his maps of Scarborough, York and Leeds and also a list of the subscribers. Originally 138 people subscribed to 192 copies of the Leeds plan; only one copy is now accessible, in Leeds City Museum. It has been suggested that Thoresby was instrumental in hiring Cossins, and a copy of the map is kept at the Thoresby Society.

Life 
The son of a London grocer, John Cossins was born on February 20, 1682, in London. The family grocery business was situated in St Paul's Churchyard. In 1714 he married Martha Innys, the daughter of a Bristol merchant and they lived in London until his retirement from his grocery business in 1732. He, like his father, Roger Cossins, was an active member of the Worshipful Company of Bowyers in the City of London. On retirement he bought the old Elizabethan manor at Redland in Bristol and an estate attached of approximately 42 acres. Between 1732 and 1735 a new house was built to his design. He replaced the old manor house with Redland Court, a house of Classical design in a prominent position and with beautiful gardens. The architect Cossins employed was John Strahan.

From 1732 onwards Cossins enlarged his estate (by the time of his death in 1759 it was estimated to be 169 acres) and was also responsible for the building of Redland Chapel (now Redland church) in 1740, which was originally the Court's private chapel and designed by Strahan and William Halfpenny. It was built in the same style as Redland Court to a very simple, yet elegant design. John Cossins and his wife Martha were buried in Redland Chapel on their deaths in 1759 and 1762 respectively. They had no children and on Martha's death the house and estate were inherited by her brothers, Jeremy and John Innys. Much of Cossins' estate was sold off by subsequent owners of Redland Court and housing development occurred on the land in the 19th century. Cossins name is commemorated in Cossins Road, a residential street which was once on his land. Redland Court still stands and was the site of Redland High School for Girls from 1882-2017. The site is currently being renovated and developed as private housing (2020).

References

Murray, Hugh ed. (1997) Scarborough, York and Leeds, the Town Plans of John Cossins 1697-1743 York Architectural and Archaeological Society.
Freedman, Rita (1994) A Mapmaker's Notebook: John Cossins c.1726-28 York Georgian Society Annual Report for 1994:8-22.

1697 births
1743 deaths
English cartographers
18th-century English people
18th-century cartographers
Geography of Yorkshire